Patrick O'Neill (born 2 March 1956) is an Irish former Gaelic footballer who played as a right wing-back with the senior Galway county team.

Honours
 Tuam Stars
 Galway Senior Football Championship (3): 1984, 1988, 1989

 Galway
 Connacht Senior Football Championship (3): 1982, 1983, 1984
 National Football League (1): 1980-81

References

1956 births
Living people
Gaelic football backs
Galway inter-county Gaelic footballers
Tuam Stars Gaelic footballers